Meir Nitzan (born 1931) is an Israeli politician. He was mayor of Rishon Lezion for five consecutive terms.

Biography
Meir Nitzan was born in Bucharest, Romania. He lived in a displaced persons' camp in Cyprus before making Aliyah at age 16. Upon his arrival in Israel, he lived in the then-transit camp Pardes Hanna. In the Israel Defense Forces, Nitzan served in the Ordnance Corps and reached the rank of colonel. He retired in 1979, but returned upon a promotion to brigadier general as the deputy head of the Technological and Logistics Directorate.

Political career
Nitzan became mayor of Rishon LeZion in 1983 and was re-elected four times. In November 2008, he lost the municipal elections to Dov Zur. After his defeat, Nitzan announced that he would run in the Kadima party primaries and vie for a seat in the Knesset in the 2009 elections. However, he later left the party to support Likud as he was unhappy with the behaviour of party leader Tzipi Livni. Kadima claimed Nitzan quit because the party refused to cover his campaign debts.
 
Nitzan served as acting mayor of Lod in 2011–2013.

References

1931 births
Living people
Israeli generals
Kadima politicians
Likud politicians
Mayors of places in Israel
People from Lod
Mayors of Rishon LeZion
Romanian emigrants to Israel
Romanian Jews
Technion – Israel Institute of Technology alumni